U.S. Route 220 (US 220) is a U.S. Highway that travels from Rockingham, North Carolina, to South Waverly, Pennsylvania.

Route description

From the state line, US 220 parallels the South Branch Potomac River as it progresses northward.  north of Harper, US 220 travels through Franklin, where it intersects US 33.

 
Within Grant County, US 220 intersects the concurrent routes of West Virginia Route 28 (WV 28) and WV 55 in Petersburg. The two state highways join US 220 eastward into Hardy County. WV 28 and WV 55 remain concurrent to Moorefield, where WV 55 splits from US 220/WV 28. North of Moorefield, US 220/WV 28 intersects the future right-of-way of US 48. US 220 and WV 28 remain concurrent into Hampshire County, where they meet US 50 in Junction. WV 28 departs US 220, following US 50 to the east, while US 220 joins US 50 westward into Mineral County. This stretch of US 220 is known as the Northwestern Turnpike.

At the top of Knobly Mountain northwest of Ridgeville, US 220 splits from US 50 and resumes a northerly alignment as it descends into the New Creek Valley. It is known as Cut Off Road south of WV 93 and New Creek Drive from there to Keyser, the county seat of Mineral County, where it becomes known as Mineral Street. At the northern edge of Keyser, US 220 crosses the North Branch Potomac River via Memorial Bridge, leaving West Virginia and entering Maryland.

Junction list

See also

External links

 US 220 on AARoads.com

20-2
 West Virginia
U.S. Route 220
U.S. Route 220
U.S. Route 220
U.S. Route 220
U.S. Route 220